Ostrówek  is a village in Wieluń County, Łódź Voivodeship, in central Poland. It is the seat of the gmina (administrative district) called Gmina Ostrówek.

The village has a population of 520.

References

Villages in Wieluń County